Willie Riley Hardeman, Jr. (born October 21, 1954) is a former undrafted American football running back in the National Football League for the Washington Redskins.  Hardeman also played for the Toronto Argonauts of the CFL, and the Washington Federals of the USFL. He played college football at Iowa State University.

A dual threat quarterback at Iowa State University from 1973-1976

In his 1978 season with the Toronto Argonauts, he caught four passes for 37 yards
in addition to 12 yards on the ground

Recorded a record called :A Bit Of The Bunch With Friends From The Start - Workin' Our Way Back To You (7")  with Dave Butz and Monte Coleman 

He was a member of the inaugural Washington Federals(USFL) squad in 1983, where he caught 18 passes for 114 yards.

1954 births
Living people
Sportspeople from Auburn, New York
Auburn High School (Auburn, New York) alumni
American football running backs
Washington Redskins players
Washington Federals/Orlando Renegades players
Iowa State Cyclones football players